Hauffenia lucidulus (also known as Horatia lucidulus) is a species of minute freshwater snail with an operculum, an aquatic gastropod mollusc or micromollusc in the family Hydrobiidae.

Distribution
This species is endemic to Bulgaria, where it is known from one locality in South Dobrudza on the coast of the Black Sea. According to Bodon (pers. comm. 2009), this species has not been found since 1960, and therefore the current status is uncertain.

References

Hauffenia
Hydrobiidae
Gastropods described in 1967